Notre Dame Broadcasting Corporation (NDBC) is a radio network based in Kidapawan. It is an affiliate of Catholic Media Network.

Awards
The network won two awards in the audio category at the International Committee of the Red Cross Human Reporting Awards in 2013 for two features: Tudok Firiz: Meketefu and Mga Bakwit: TNT (Takbo-ng-Takbo) sa Maguindanao.

In 2013 the network also won two national journalism awards from the Philippines Department of Health for health reporting.

In 2014 the station won three Golden Dove Awards from the Kapisanan ng mga Brodkaster ng Pilipinas for Best Radio Documentary Program, Best Radio Special Program and Best Science and Technology program host, as well as nominations for Best Public Affairs Service program host, and Best Radio Public Service Announcement. It was also awarded Best Agriculture Radio segment at the Bright Leaf Agriculture Journalism Awards.

In 2015 the station's weekly peace segment won an award from the Catholic Mass Media Association.

Radio stations

Radyo Bida

Happy FM

References

External links

 of NDBC News, the company's news department

Radio stations established in 1956
Radio stations in the Philippines
Philippine radio networks
Mass media companies of the Philippines
Mass media in Cotabato
Philippine companies established in 1956
Mass media companies established in 1956
Privately held companies